Conrad Hotels & Resorts is an American multinational brand of high-end luxury hotels and high-end resorts owned and operated by Hilton Worldwide. Conrad was considered the luxury flagship brand in the Hilton Family of Brands, named after company founder Conrad Hilton, until being supplanted by The Waldorf-Astoria Collection in 2006. As of December 31, 2021, it has 42 locations with 15,085 rooms in 21 countries and territories, including two that are owned or leased with 778 rooms, 38 that are managed with 12,152 rooms, and two that are franchised with 2,155 rooms.

History

Barron Hilton, son of Conrad Hilton, founded Conrad Hotels, taking the name from that of his father. Hilton Hotels was, at the time, a separate company from Hilton International, and could not operate hotels outside the United States under the Hilton name. The newly named chain solved that problem. Hilton International had already started their own chain of Vista Hotels within the United States, as they faced the same prohibition on operating there under the Hilton name. The first Conrad hotel, the Conrad Jupiters Gold Coast in Australia, opened its doors in 1985.

When the two Hilton chains were rejoined in 2005, the need for the Vista and Conrad names vanished. Vista was phased out, while the Conrad brand was retained as a luxury wing of Hilton. Numerous hotels have since been opened under that name in the United States and elsewhere.

In 2017, Marie Jean Pierre, a former dishwasher at the Conrad Miami Hotel, sued the Conrad in the U.S. District Court for the Southern District of Florida claiming the Miami hotel had violated the Civil Rights Act of 1964. Her religious beliefs prevented her from working on Sundays, and she claimed in the lawsuit that the hotel wouldn't accommodate her. In 2019, Ms. Pierre was awarded $21.5 million by a jury, but did not receive the full amount because punitive damages in the United States cannot exceed $300,000.

Properties

References

External links

Hilton Worldwide
Hotels established in 1985
American companies established in 1985